Eduardo Santos Montejo (August 28, 1888 – March 27, 1974) was a leading Colombian publisher and politician, active in the Colombian Liberal Party. He owned the prominent Bogotá newspaper El Tiempo, and served as the President of Colombia from August 1938 to August 1942, having been elected without opposition. He was born and died in Bogotá, and was the great-uncle of the 32nd president of Colombia, Juan Manuel Santos (2010–2018) and former Colombian Vice President Francisco Santos Calderon (2002–2010).

External links
 

1888 births
1974 deaths
Presidents of Colombia
Governors of Santander Department
Colombian journalists
Male journalists
20th-century Colombian lawyers
Maria Moors Cabot Prize winners
Eduardo
Presidential Designates of Colombia
Foreign ministers of Colombia
Colombian Liberal Party politicians
Burials at Central Cemetery of Bogotá
Politicians from Bogotá
20th-century journalists